Tayavek Gallizzi (born February 8, 1993) is an Argentine professional basketball player who currently plays for Regatas Corrientes of the Argentine Liga Nacional de Básquet (LNB). He defends Argentina.

Professional career
Gallizzi began his professional club basketball career with Quilmes Mar del Plata. He helped Quilmes earn a league promotion from the Argentine 2nd Division (TNA) to the Argentine 1st Division (LNB), in the 2012–13 season. He joined the Argentine club Quimsa in 2016 and moved to the Argentine club, Club La Unión, in 2017.

National team career
Gallizzi suited up for Argentina at the 2014 FIBA World Cup. He played for Argentina at the 2015 FIBA Americas Championship bringing home a silver medal, and he also participated in the 2017 FIBA AmeriCup. He played for Argentina at the 2019 FIBA Basketball World Cup and brought home a silver medal after a loss in the tournament final against Spain at the 2019 FIBA Basketball World Cup.

In 2022, Galizzi won the gold medal in the 2022 FIBA AmeriCup held in Recife, Brazil. He was one of Argentina's centers in the tournament.

References

External links
 Tayavek Gallizzi at eurobasket.com
 Tayavek Gallizzi at fiba.com

1993 births
Living people
2014 FIBA Basketball World Cup players
Argentine men's basketball players
Basketball players at the 2015 Pan American Games
Basketball players at the 2019 Pan American Games
Basketball players at the 2020 Summer Olympics
Centers (basketball)
La Unión basketball players
Olympic basketball players of Argentina
Pan American Games medalists in basketball
Power forwards (basketball)
Regatas Corrientes basketball players
Quilmes de Mar del Plata basketball players
Quimsa basketball players
Sportspeople from Santa Fe, Argentina
2019 FIBA Basketball World Cup players
Pan American Games gold medalists for Argentina
Medalists at the 2019 Pan American Games